The 1986 FIFA World Cup qualification CONMEBOL Group 3 was a CONMEBOL qualifying group for the 1986 FIFA World Cup. The group comprised Bolivia, Brazil and Paraguay.

The group was won by Brazil, who qualified for the 1986 FIFA World Cup. Runners up were Paraguay who entered the CONMEBOL play-off stage.

Standings

Results

External links
Fifa.com page
Rsssf page
Results and Scorers

3
World Cup qualification (CONMEBOL)